The 2019 British Grand Prix (formally known as the Formula 1 Rolex British Grand Prix 2019) was a Formula One motor race held on 14 July 2019 at the Silverstone Circuit in Silverstone, United Kingdom. The race was the 10th round of the 2019 Formula One World Championship. It marked the 74th running of the British Grand Prix, the 70th time that the race has been run as a World Championship event and the 53rd time that the World Championship event has been held at the Silverstone Circuit. Lewis Hamilton won the race for a record sixth time.

Background
Formally called the "Formula 1 Rolex British Grand Prix 2019", this was a Formula One Grand Prix event and the tenth round of the 2019 Formula One World Championship. The event took place over the weekend of 12–14 July 2019 at the Silverstone motor racing circuit in Northamptonshire. With the first British Grand Prix having been held in 1926 and the second in 1927 and then there having been one held each year since 1948, with each race since 1950 being a World Championship event, the 2019 event was the 74th time that the British Grand Prix had been held and the 70th time it had been a World Championship event.

The race was officially started by Charlie Whiting's son, Justin Whiting, as a tribute to his father, who had died prior to the season opening 2019 Australian Grand Prix. Prior to the start of the race, Sebastian Vettel gave a brief speech in commemoration of Whiting.

Championship standings before the race 
Heading into the race, Lewis Hamilton had a 31-point advantage over teammate Valtteri Bottas in the Drivers' Championship. In the Constructors' Championship, Mercedes held a 135-point advantage over Ferrari.

Entrants

The drivers and teams entered were the same as those on the season entry list with no additional stand-in drivers for either the race or practice.

Practice 
The first practice session ended with Pierre Gasly fastest for Red Bull almost half a second ahead of second placed Valtteri Bottas who was a further 0.4 seconds ahead of Gasly's teammate Max Verstappen. The only major incidents were Romain Grosjean crashing his car on the pit exit and Kimi Räikkönen's Alfa Romeo stopping on the Wellington straight, the latter of which brought out a red flag. The drivers all struggled with track grip levels throughout the session due to the track having been recently resurfaced and although there was some brief rain it had little impact on the running in the session.

Qualifying

Qualifying classification

Race

Race summary 
On Lap 1, the two Haas drivers collided at the exit of turn five. Both cars pitted, but both would go on to retire as a result of the damage, Kevin Magnussen on Lap 6 and Romain Grosjean on Lap 9. Valtteri Bottas and Lewis Hamilton fought for the lead, with Bottas maintaining 1st place until Lap 4, when Hamilton overtook at turn seven. Bottas then regained the lead shortly after at turn nine.

After battling for 3rd place in the preceding laps, Charles Leclerc and Max Verstappen entered the pits at the same time on Lap 14, with Leclerc ahead. The Red Bull pit stop was the faster of the two and Verstappen emerged in front after the two cars were side by side whilst driving through the pit-lane. However, this lead would not last, as Verstappen ran wide shortly after at turn 4, allowing Leclerc through.

Bottas pitted from the lead at the end of Lap 16, emerging behind Hamilton and Sebastian Vettel. Three laps later, Antonio Giovinazzi, who was running in 9th place, suffered a mechanical failure and spun into the gravel at turn 16. This incident brought out the safety car, allowing Hamilton an advantageous pit stop, maintaining the lead from Bottas. Other drivers including Vettel, Leclerc, Verstappen and Pierre Gasly also came into the pits.

Racing resumed on Lap 24. Sergio Pérez and Nico Hülkenberg made contact shortly after the restart, damaging Pérez's front wing. This forced Pérez to pit and caused him to eventually finish the race last of the running cars in 17th place. Verstappen and Leclerc continued to battle for position, until Verstappen began to pull away and was allowed through by his teammate Gasly, taking 4th place.

Leclerc overtook Gasly around the outside of turn 3 on Lap 36, taking 5th position. Shortly after, Verstappen took 3rd place from Vettel on the Hangar Straight. However, in an attempt to retake the position, Vettel locked up his brakes and collided with the back of the Red Bull at the entry to turn 16. Both cars spun into the gravel, but were able to escape and continue the race, with them both emerging behind Leclerc and Gasly. Vettel fell down the order over the remainder of the lap due to damage to his front wing, before pitting to have it replaced. He would go on to cross the line in 15th place, but was handed a 10-second penalty for causing a collision, demoting him to 16th.

Lewis Hamilton won the race for a record sixth time, claiming the extra point for recording the fastest lap of the race on his final lap, and setting a new lap record of 1:27.369.

On lap 12, for Pierre Gasly's pit stop, the Red Bull Racing team broke the record for the fastest pit stop time, with 1.91 seconds, beating the previous time of 1.92 seconds, which was jointly held by Red Bull and Williams and had stood since 2013.

Race classification 

Notes
  – Includes one point for fastest lap.
  – Sebastian Vettel originally finished 15th, but received a 10-second time penalty for causing a collision with Max Verstappen.

Championship standings after the race

Drivers' Championship standings

Constructors' Championship standings

See also 
 2019 Silverstone Formula 2 round
 2019 Silverstone Formula 3 round

References

External links

British
British Grand Prix
Grand Prix
Grand Prix
British Grand Prix